Apostolepis intermedia, Koslowsky's blackhead or Mato Grosso burrowing snake, is a species of snake in the family Colubridae. It is found in Brazil and Paraguay.

References 

intermedia
Reptiles described in 1898
Reptiles of Brazil
Reptiles of Paraguay
Taxa named by Julio Germán Koslowsky